Revivalism in architecture is the use of visual styles that consciously echo the style of a previous architectural era. Notable revival styles include Neoclassical architecture (a revival of Classical architecture), and Gothic Revival (a revival of Gothic architecture). Revivalism is related to historicism.

Architecture produced during the 19th century, including Victorian architecture, is especially associated with revivalism.

History

19th-early 20th centuries

The idea that architecture might represent the glory of kingdoms can be traced to the dawn of civilisation, but the notion that architecture can bear the stamp of national character is a modern idea, that appeared in the 18th century historical thinking and given political currency in the wake of the French Revolution. As the map of Europe was repeatedly changing, architecture was used to grant the aura of a glorious past to even the most recent nations. In addition to the credo of universal Classicism, two new, and often contradictory, attitudes on historical styles existed in the early 19th century. Pluralism promoted the simultaneous use of the expanded range of style, while Revivalism held that a single historical model was appropriate for modern architecture. Associations between styles and building types appeared, for example: Egyptian for prisons, Gothic for churches, or Renaissance Revival for banks and exchanges. These choices were the result of other associations: the pharaohs with death and eternity, the Middle Ages with Christianity, or the Medici family with the rise of banking and modern commerce.

Whether their choice was Classical, medieval, or Renaissance, all revivalists shared the strategy of advocating a particular style based on national history, one of the great enterprises of historians in the early 19th century. Only one historic period  was claimed to be the only one capable of providing models grounded in national traditions, institutions, or values. Issues of style became matters of state. 

The most well-known Revivalist style is the Gothic Revival one, that appeared in the mid-18th century in the houses of a number of wealthy antiquarians in England, a notable example being the Strawberry Hill House. German Romantic writers and architects were the first to promote Gothic as a powerful expression of national character, and in turn use it as a symbol of national identity in territories still divided. Johann Gottfried Herder posed the question 'Why should we always imitate foreigners, as if we were Greeks or Romans?'.

Present
Modern-day revival styles can be summarized within New Classical architecture. Revivalism is not to be confused with complementary architecture, which looks to the previous architectural styles as means of architectural continuity.

Movements
Mixed

Eclecticism – Conscious mixing of disparate historical styles
 Historicism or Historism – mixed revivals that can include several older styles, combined with new elements
 Indo-Saracenic architecture (revival of Indian architecture and Islamic architecture)
Mediterranean Revival architecture (revival of Italian Renaissance architecture and Spanish Baroque architecture)
 New Classical Architecture – an umbrella term for modern-day architecture following pre-modernist principles
 Russian Revival architecture – generic term for a number of different movements within Russian architecture that arose in second quarter of the 19th century.
 Traditionalist School – revival of different regional traditional styles
 Vernacular architecture – umbrella term for regional architecture traditions continuing through the eras, also used and cited in revival architecture

Ancient Revival

 Egyptian Revival architecture (revival of Ancient Egyptian architecture)
 Mycenaean Revival architecture (revival of Mycenaean Greek architecture)
 Renaissance architecture (earlier revival of Classical architecture)
 Neoclassical architecture (later revival of Classical architecture)
Palladian architecture
Louis XVI style
Federal architecture
Jeffersonian architecture
Empire style
Regency architecture
Beaux-Arts architecture (also in the City Beautiful movement)

Russian neoclassical revival
Greek Revival architecture and Neo-Grec (revivals of Ancient Greek architecture)

Medieval Revival

 Byzantine Revival architecture (revival of Byzantine architecture)
 Bristol Byzantine
 Russo-Byzantine architecture
 Romanian Revival
 Serbo-Byzantine revival
 Romanesque Revival architecture (revival of Romanesque architecture)
Romanesque Revival Architecture in the United Kingdom
 Richardsonian Romanesque
 Gothic Revival architecture (revival of Gothic architecture)
 Carpenter Gothic
 Collegiate Gothic
 High Victorian Gothic
 Scots Baronial Style architecture
 Neo-Manueline (revival of Manueline)
 Moorish Revival architecture (revival of Moorish architecture)
 Neo-Mudéjar
Tudor Revival architecture (revival of Tudor Style architecture)
Black-and-white Revival architecture

Renaissance Revival
 Renaissance Revival architecture (revival of Renaissance architecture)
 Italianate architecture
 Palazzo style architecture – revival based on Italian Palazzo
 Mediterranean Revival architecture (revival of Italian Renaissance architecture & Spanish Renaissance architecture)
 Palladian Revival architecture (revival of Palladian architecture)
 Châteauesque (revival of French Renaissance architecture)
 Jacobethan (revival of Jacobean architecture and Elizabethan architecture)
 Stile Umbertino (revival of Italian Renaissance architecture)

Baroque Revival
 Baroque Revival architecture (revival of Baroque architecture)
 Dutch Revival architecture (revival of Dutch Baroque architecture)
 Spanish Revival architecture (revival of Spanish Baroque architecture)
 Edwardian Baroque architecture
 Stalinist baroque
 English Baroque
 California Churrigueresque (revival of Churrigueresque and Mexican Baroque)

Other revival
Neo Art Deco (revival of Art Deco architecture)
Cape Cod Revival (revival of Cape Cod)
Dutch Colonial Revival architecture (revival of Dutch Colonial architecture)
Georgian Revival architecture (revival of Georgian architecture)
Colonial Revival architecture (revival of American Colonial architecture)
Mayan Revival architecture (revival of Maya architecture)
Pueblo Revival Style architecture (revival of Puebloan traditional architecture)
Spanish Colonial Revival architecture (revival of Spanish Colonial architecture)
Mission Revival Style architecture (revival of the architecture of the California missions)
 Territorial Revival architecture (revival of Territorial architecture)

References

Further reading
 Scott Trafton (2004), Egypt Land: Race and Nineteenth-Century American Egyptomania, Duke University Press, . p. 142.

External links
 

 
 
Historicist architecture
Architectural history
Architectural styles